Vivion Laurence de Valera (13 December 1910 – 16 February 1982) was an Irish Fianna Fáil politician, businessman and lawyer who served as a Teachta Dála (TD) from 1945 to 1981.

He was the eldest child of Éamon de Valera and Sinéad de Valera. He was named after his paternal grandfather, Juan Vivion de Valera.

Born in Dublin in 1910, Vivion de Valera was educated at Blackrock College, University College Dublin (MSc, PhD) and King's Inns. While at UCD, he was auditor of the Literary and Historical Society. He was called to the Bar in 1937. After military service during The Emergency, de Valera retired from the army with the rank of Major. For this reason he was often referred to as Major de Valera including in the Dáil reports. 

In 1945, he embarked on a political career, being elected as a Fianna Fáil TD for Dublin North-West at a by-election following the resignation of Fianna Fáil TD Seán T. O'Kelly on his election as President of Ireland. He served in Dáil Éireann until 1981. He was a director of The Irish Press from 1932 until 1982 and managing director from 1951 until 1982.

Vivion de Valera died in Bray in 1982. He was also the uncle of former ministers and TDs Síle de Valera and Éamon Ó Cuív.

References

1910 births
1982 deaths
Children of presidents of Ireland
Children of Taoisigh
De Valera family
Fianna Fáil TDs
Members of the 12th Dáil
Members of the 13th Dáil
Members of the 14th Dáil
Members of the 15th Dáil
Members of the 16th Dáil
Members of the 17th Dáil
Members of the 18th Dáil
Members of the 19th Dáil
Members of the 20th Dáil
Members of the 21st Dáil
People from County Dublin
Auditors of the Literary and Historical Society (University College Dublin)
The Irish Press people
People educated at Blackrock College
Alumni of University College Dublin
Irish Army officers
Alumni of King's Inns